Ralph Lyford (February 22, 1882 – September 3, 1927) was an American composer and conductor.  He rose to prominence as the managing director of the Cincinnati Opera and as a 20th-century advocate for opera to be written and performed in English.

He was married to Ella Gillis, a ballet dancer.

Biography
Born in Worcester, Massachusetts, he began studies at age 12 and 6 years later graduated from Boston's New England Conservatory of Music.  Lyford studied under George Whitefield Chadwick at the New England Conservatory of Music, and studied under Arthur Nikisch in Leipzig.

Ralph Lyford assisted Claude Debussy in preparing his Le martyre de Saint Sébastien for its premiere. He served as assistant conductor in the US for the San Carlo Opera Company under the management of Henry Russell. Lyford was associate conductor of the Boston Opera Company from 1908–1914, working as a member of Max Rabinoff's staff and for a short time assisted in the opera department at the New England Conservatory. Later he conducted 3 seasons from 1912-1915 of over 200 presentations of operas with the Aborn Opera Company.

In 1912, Lyford conducted Lucia di Lammermoor at the Opera Company of Boston.

He was hired in 1916 to organize the Cincinnati Conservatory of Music and served as the head of that program. In 1920, he founded the Cincinnati Opera. In 1925, he was appointed associate conductor under Fritz Reiner. He led the opera during its first formative seasons. During his tenure, he produced and conducted 234 performances of 30 operas including Martha, Hänsel and Gretel, and Lohengrin.

Lyford died in Cincinnati, Ohio in 1927 on September 3 of heart disease.

During his tenure at the Cincinnati Opera Company Lyford also mentored John Jacob Niles. Niles said, "Ralph Lyford was a great conductor, teacher, humorist and accompanist. He helped me greatly with the problems I had in playing accompaniments."

Music
Ralph Lyford wrote mainly orchestral music, including a piano concerto. He wrote the opera Castle Agrazant, which won a Bispham Memorial Medal Award in 1926.

Timeline

References

Further reading

1882 births
1927 deaths
American male classical composers
American classical composers
Musicians from Worcester, Massachusetts
Musicians from Cincinnati
American opera composers
Male opera composers
New England Conservatory alumni
American male conductors (music)
Pupils of George Whitefield Chadwick
New England Conservatory faculty
20th-century classical composers
20th-century American conductors (music)
20th-century American composers
Classical musicians from Massachusetts
Classical musicians from Ohio
20th-century American male musicians